Sophie Abbatangelo (born 27 June 1990) is an Australian rules footballer who last played for the North Melbourne Football Club in the AFL Women's competition (AFLW). Abbatangelo was signed by North Melbourne as a free agent during the expansion club signing period in 2018. It was revealed Abbatangelo was likely to explore the option of a trade in the wake of the 2021 AFL Women's season. However, she ended up honouring her contract with the club, which had her at the club until 2022. In March 2023, Abbatangelo was delisted by North Melbourne.

References

External links 

1990 births
Living people
North Melbourne Football Club (AFLW) players
Australian rules footballers from Victoria (Australia)
Melbourne University Football Club (VFLW) players